Pseudomops neglectus is a species from the genus Pseudomops.

References

Cockroaches